Little West Kill flows into the Schoharie Creek by Lexington, New York.

References

Rivers of New York (state)
Rivers of Greene County, New York
Rivers of Delaware County, New York